Dominic Mohan (born 26 May 1969) is a British journalist, broadcaster, businessman/ entrepreneur, author and former editor of The Sun newspaper in London. He is now Founder/CEO of his own media consultancy Dominic Mohan Media, specialising in communications, public relations, crisis management and content creation.

Mohan was born in Bristol, but his family moved to Cambridgeshire when he was 10 years old. He attended the Neale-Wade Community College in March, before graduating from Southampton University in English. While studying for his degree he wrote for and then edited Wessex News (now Wessex Scene), the Southampton University student newspaper, and won a scholarship to study English and Journalism at Rutgers University in New Jersey, USA.

He joined The Sun in 1996, working on the "Bizarre" Column and editing it between 1998 and 2003. He then became Assistant Editor and columnist before being made Associate Editor (Features) in 2004. Mohan was appointed deputy editor of The Sun in 2007 by Rebekah Brooks, and was named as her replacement in 2009 following Brooks' promotion to chief executive of News International. He launched The Sun On Sunday in February 2012, becoming The Suns first seven-day editor.
Mohan conceived the idea of re-recording Band Aid's "Do They Know It's Christmas?" in 2004, for which he received the Hugh Cudlipp Award at the British Press Awards in 2005. He was instrumental in setting up the Live 8 concert which followed.

He has also worked for Virgin Radio as a broadcaster. For his interview with The Who's Roger Daltrey he received a Sony Radio Academy Gold Award in 2003. Mohan has since worked with the Teenage Cancer Trust, of which Daltrey is patron.

In June 2013, Mohan left The Sun to work as a consultant to Robert Thomson, chief executive of parent company News Corp. He was succeeded as Sun editor by David Dinsmore.

In September 2015, it was announced that Mohan would be working as Outside's Chief Executive Officer alongside founder and now Chairman Alan Edwards. He left The Outside Organisation in November 2018.

The book "Morgan Howell at 45 RPM" published in October 2020 featuring 95 of Morgan's amazing paintings of 7" singles, has been co written by Mohan, and every painting features contributions from fans and celebrities with memories and anectdotes about each record.

Personal life
Mohan lives in north London with his wife and four children. His younger sister Isabel is also a journalist.

References

1969 births
Living people
Alumni of the University of Southampton
British male journalists
British newspaper editors
People from Cambridgeshire
The Sun (United Kingdom) editors